Leonhardi is a surname. Notable people with the surname include:

Eduard Leonhardi (1828–1905), German painter
Johann Gottfried Leonhardi (1746–1823), German physician and chemist
Moritz von Leonhardi (1856–1910), German anthropologist

See also 
Aristotelia leonhardi, a moth of the family Gelechiidae
Monopeltis leonhardi (Kalahari worm lizard), a worm lizard species in the family Amphisbaenidae
Leonardi (disambiguation)